Senator Bellinger may refer to:

Frederick P. Bellinger (1792–1876), New York State Senate
Joseph Bellinger (1773–1830), South Carolina State Senate